The Sultanes de Monterrey are a professional baseball team in the Mexican League based in Monterrey, Mexico. They compete in the Northern Division. The team also joined the Mexican Pacific League for the 2019–20 season following the conclusion of the Mexican League season, making them the only team to participate in both the summer and winter leagues in Mexico.

History

The team was formed on May 20, 1939, as Carta Blanca (a local beer brand, owned by Cervecería Cuauhtémoc Moctezuma which owned the team). The team was renamed to Industriales in 1942. In 1948 it was renamed again to their current name, Sultanes. The team was also known as the Gray Ghosts. The team won its first championship in 1943. In total, the Sultanes have collected ten championships (1943, 1947, 1948, 1949, 1962, 1991, 1995, 1996, 2007. and 2018), including three straight (1947–1949) under the legendary Cuban manager Lázaro Salazar. 
During the seasons from 1989-1994 both the Sultanes and the Industriales played in the Mexican League for Monterrey.

On January 27, 2019, during a rally at the Estadio Francisco Carranza Limón in Guasave, Sinaloa, Mexican President Andrés Manuel López Obrador announced that the Algodoneros de Guasave would return to compete in the Mexican Pacific League beginning in the 2019–20 winter season. The Sultanes were announced as the other team to join the league, bringing the total number of LMP teams to ten. A draft was later held to fill the team, making it a different roster than the one that competes in the Summer league.

Average home league attendance

The Sultanes have led LMB in average per game attendance every season from 2012 through 2017.

Most valuable players and retired numbers
  5 Daniel Ríos ("La Coyota") (1995)
  7 Epitacio Torres ("Mala") (1994)
  9 Vinicio García (1987)
17 Lázaro Salazar (1998)
20 Miguel Flores (2011)
21 Héctor Espino (1996)
22 Arturo González (1997)

Roster

See also
 Sultanes de Monterrey players

References

External links
  

Baseball teams in Mexico
Sports teams in Monterrey
Baseball teams established in 1939
Mexican League teams
1939 establishments in Mexico